Jeion Antonia Ward (born January 6, 1954) is an American politician of the Democratic Party. Since 2004 she has been a member of the Virginia House of Delegates. She  represents the 92nd district in the city of Hampton.

, Ward serves as the Chair of the Labor and Commerce Committee and as a member of the Transportation Committee, Communications, Technology and Innovation Committee, and the Rules Committee.

Notes

References

Jeion Joyner Ward for Delegate(Constituent/campaign website)

External links

1954 births
Living people
Women state legislators in Virginia
Democratic Party members of the Virginia House of Delegates
Thomas Nelson Community College alumni
Christopher Newport University alumni
Politicians from Hampton, Virginia
Politicians from Newport News, Virginia
21st-century American politicians
21st-century American women politicians